Ghiglia is a surname. Notable people with the surname include:

Benedetto Ghiglia (1921–2012), Italian composer, conductor, and pianist
Oscar Ghiglia (born 1938), Italian guitarist